Zherdevsky District is an administrative and municipal district (raion), one of the twenty-three in Tambov Oblast, Russia. It is located in the south of the oblast. The district borders with Rzhaksinsky District in the north, Uvarovsky District in the east, Ternovsky District of Voronezh Oblast in the south, and with Tokaryovsky District in the west. Its administrative center is the town of Zherdevka. Population: 30,331 (2010 Census);  The population of Zherdevka accounts for 50.1% of the district's total population.

Notable residents 

Ivan Fioletov (1884–1918), revolutionary activist, born in Tugolukovo
Hennadiy Lysenchuk (born 1947), football player and coach, born in Chibizovka

References

Notes

Sources

Districts of Tambov Oblast